Joseph Maloney may refer to:

 Joseph Moloney (1857–1896), Irish-born British medical officer
 Joseph F. Maloney, Socialist Labor Party candidate for President of the United States, 1900
 Joe Maloney (1934–2006), English footballer